South Korean singer Taemin has recorded songs for four studio albums, one reissue, and six extended plays (EP). He debuted in 2008 as a member of the boy band Shinee and later established a career as a solo artist in 2014.

Songs

See also
 List of songs recorded by Shinee

References

Taemin